In Greek mythology, Nessus was a famous centaur who was killed by Heracles, and whose poisoned blood in turn killed Heracles. He was the son of Centauros. He fought in the battle with the Lapiths and became a ferryman on the river Euenos.

Mythology
Nessus is known for his role in the story of the Tunic of Nessus. After carrying Deianeira, the wife of Heracles, across the river, he attempted to have intercourse with her. Heracles saw this from across the river and shot a Hydra-poisoned arrow into Nessus's breast. As he lay dying, as a final act of malice, Nessus told Deianeira that his blood would ensure that Heracles would be true to her forever, knowing the blood to be infected with the hydra's poison.

Deianeira foolishly believed him. Later, when her trust began to wane because of Iole, she spread the centaur's blood on a robe and gave it to her husband. Heracles went to a gathering of heroes, where his passion got the better of him. Meanwhile, Deianeira accidentally spilled a portion of the centaur's blood onto the floor. To her horror, it began to fume by the light of the rising sun.

She instantly recognized it as poison and sent her messenger to warn Heracles but it was too late. Heracles lay dying slowly and painfully as the robe burned his skin—either in actual flames or by the heat of poison. He died a noble death on a funeral pyre of oak branches. Heracles was then taken to Mount Olympus by Zeus and welcomed among the gods for his heroic exploits.

A similar theme appears in certain versions of the story of Medea.

Sophocles' play Trachiniae (Women of Trachis) is extensively based on a retelling of this myth.

In popular culture
 In Dante Alighieri's Inferno, Nessus is among the centaurs who patrol the outer rings of the Circle of Violence, making sure those immersed in the Phlegethon don't get out of their position. He was appointed by Chiron to guide Dante and Virgil alongside the Phlegethon.
 Nessus appears as an antagonist in the Disney movie Hercules voiced by Jim Cummings. In the film, he is portrayed as a lecherous river guardian and is Hercules's first major opponent. Hercules defeats him in battle and saves Megara from him, but it is later revealed that Megara had been sent by Hades to recruit Nessus for his cause. Nessus appears in the video game based on the film and serves as the game's first boss, in the episode "Hercules and the Arabian Night" as Hades's chessboard Piece from the animated series bases on the film and in the episode "Salute to Sports" as a cameo from the TV series House of Mouse.
 One of the main characters in Larry Niven's series of books from the Ringworld universe is called Nessus. He is of an alien race with a three-legged body similar to an ostrich without feathers and two snake-like heads on long necks.
 In Gene Wolfe's novel The Book of the New Sun, the metropolis Nessus seems to be named for this character's poisoned blood, as the city had a different name back when "the river was unpoisoned."
 Nessus appears in Dante's Inferno: An Animated Epic (which is based on the video game Dante's Inferno) voiced by Charlotte Cornwell. This version is depicted as a female and is a good friend of Virgil. She helps Dante and Virgil across the Phlegethon.
 The episode is the basis for a section of T.S. Eliot's Four Quartets, Little Gidding IV, mirroring the greater theme of the poem.
 Nessus appears as a boss character in the 2006 video game Titan Quest.
 Nessus is the name of the Centaur (minor planet) setting of a playable location in the 2017 video game Destiny 2. It is also mentioned in a grimoire card in the first game of the series, where Cayde-6 comes across a mention of the planetoid's erratic motions while searching the Tower's database, leading him to enter the queries "did we get invaded by horse people?" and "did horse people ever exist?"
Nessus also appears as a boss character in the 2008 video game Rise of the Argonauts.
Nessus appears in the 1994 made-for-TV movie Hercules in the Underworld, played by Cliff Curtis. He also played Nessus's twin brother Nemis in the episode "As Darkness Falls" from the TV series Hercules: The Legendary Journeys.

References

Bibliography
 F. Diez de Velasco, "Nessos", Lexicon Iconographicum Mythologiae Classicae, Munich-Zurich, Artemis Verlag, vol. VI,1, 1992, 838–847 & VI,2, 1992, 534–555.

External links
 Perseus Project – Nessus and the Death of Hercules
 Perseus Project – Apollodorus
 Theoi Project – Nessus

Centaurs
Mythology of Heracles